Jarman is a first and surname. Notable people with this name include:
Alan Jarman, Australian politician
Andrew Jarman, Australian rules footballer
Barry Jarman, Australian cricketer and Australian rules footballer
Billy Jarman, English rugby league footballer
Claude Jarman Jr., American child film actor
Darren Jarman, Australian footballer
Derek Jarman, English film director, stage designer, artist and writer
Duncan Jarman, makeup artist
Eleanor Jarman, American fugitive
Frances Eleanor Jarman, British actress
Gary Jarman, bassist with British indie rock band The Cribs
Geraint Jarman, Welsh musician
Harold Jarman, English footballer and cricketer
Harry Jarman, Welsh international rugby union player
John Jarman, American politician
Joseph Jarman, American musician
Julia Jarman, British author
Kate Jarman, Welsh actor
Lee Jarman, Welsh footballer
Mark Jarman, American poet and critic
Mark Anthony Jarman, Canadian fiction writer
Nathan Jarman, English footballer
Pauline Jarman, Welsh politician
Richard Jarman, English and Tasmanian artist and engraver 
Robert Jarman, Tasmanian theatre director and writer
Rosemary Hawley Jarman, English novelist and writer of short stories
Ross Jarman, drummer with British indie rock band The Cribs
Ryan Jarman, guitarist with British indie rock band The Cribs